Shrimp plant can refer to two plants in Acanthaceae: